Ypsolopha leuconotella is a moth of the family Ypsolophidae. It is found from Slovakia, Hungary and Romania east to Russia (South Siberian Mountains and the Amur and Primorye Regions), Kazakhstan, Japan and China.

The wingspan is 11–18 mm.

References

External links
lepiforum.de

Ypsolophidae
Moths of Asia
Moths of Europe